Twilight Hour is a 1945 British drama film directed by Paul L. Stein and starring Mervyn Johns, Basil Radford, and Marie Lohr. It was shot at the British National Studios in Elstree. The film's sets were designed by the art director Wilfred Arnold. It was based on a novel of the same title by Arthur Valentine

Cast

References

Bibliography
 Halliwell, Leslie. Halliwell's Film Guide. Scribner, 1987.

External links

British drama films
1945 drama films
Films directed by Paul L. Stein
Films set in England
British black-and-white films
Films with screenplays by Jack Whittingham
Films shot at British National Studios
1940s British films